Dinner by Heston Blumenthal is a restaurant in London, England, created by Heston Blumenthal. Opened in January 2011, it received a Michelin star within a year and earned its second in 2014. In April 2014, it was listed fifth on The World's 50 Best Restaurants in Restaurant. 

Dinner was initially headed by Ashley Palmer-Watts, formerly the head chef of another Blumenthal restaurant, the Fat Duck. When he left in December 2019, Jon Miles-Bowring became head chef. Menu items are based on historical British dishes, which were researched by food historians and through the British Library. The restaurant's opening drew interest within the industry, and reviews have been positive. Particular dishes have received praise, including the "meat fruit", a chicken liver mousse created to look like a mandarin orange.

Description
The opening of Dinner was announced in August 2010, to open in early 2011 to replace the Michelin-starred restaurant Foliage at the Mandarin Oriental Hyde Park. The opening was originally planned for 1 December, but delays occurred, which would have resulted in the restaurant being ready to open during Christmas week. The decision was made to push back the opening until after the Christmas period was over. Reservations began to be accepted on 1 December 2010 for the restaurant's opening on 31 January 2011. There were 42 phone lines set up on the opening day of reservations, which received over 600 telephone bookings. Prior to opening, the first three months were solidly booked. A Valentine's day booking was sold on auction site eBay, which went for £250.

The head chef was Ashley Palmer-Watts. Palmer-Watts had worked with Blumenthal since 1999, and for five years was head chef at Blumenthal's other restaurant, the three-Michelin-starred Fat Duck. The two chefs researched historical menu choices with help of food historian Polly Russell, curator at the British Library. When he left in December 2019, Jon Miles-Bowring became head chef.

Blumenthal's first experience of historical cuisine was in 2000 when he discovered a recipe for roast chicken which required the bird to be plucked alive, and then cooked with a small volume of mercury. This was further enhanced as he filmed Heston's Feasts for Channel 4, in which he created a variety of feasts from different historical eras including Tudor, Medieval and Victorian. Despite being called Dinner, the restaurant is also open for lunch as the meaning of the name is intended to be the main meal of the day, regardless of the time at which it is eaten.

The interior of the restaurant was designed by Adam Tihany, and features full length windows allowing diners to see straight into the kitchen. It features a pulley system based on a 16th-century design used for the British Royal Court. The brand identity items such as the logo and the menus were designed by design agency Seymourpowell. A clockwork spitroast cooks pineapples for one of the restaurant's desserts.

Menu
The restaurant intends to change the menu every three months, each menu containing historical dishes ranging from the 14th to 19th centuries. Prior to opening, there were rumours regarding the dishes to be served at Dinner, including one report from The Guardian which said an ice-cream meat pie was to appear on the menu. Dishes that do appear include scallops and peas with cucumber ketchup and bergamot cured mackerel salad. Each item has been based on a historical recipe, such as the scallop dish which dates from 1826 and was published in The Cook and Housewife's Manual by "Meg Dodds" (Christian Isobel Johnstone). One item which was reported in multiple reviews was the meat fruit, a chicken liver mousse made to look like a textured mandarin orange. The meat fruit was proving so popular that by November 2011, some 900 were being sold per week and the restaurant was aiming to increase production to be able to supply up to 1200 a week.

The ice cream trolley holds a contraption created by Blumenthal and his team, and constructed from Corian by Mike Smith Studio at a cost of £25,000. Powered by a hand crank, it mixes custard and liquid nitrogen to create instant ice cream at the tableside. A variety of sprinkles, popping candy, apple jelly and so forth are available as toppings. The menus themselves include details such as the year from which the menu item originates.

Reception

In The Independent, the chef Mark Hix said Dinner produced the best meal he had he had eaten in "at least two years". He described the meat fruit starter as "astonishing", and said it could have been seen as gimmicky, but "when it tastes that good, it's difficult to complain". Tracey Macleod dined with Hix, and also praised the restaurant describing it as "no-fuss" and "direct". She also wrote that Hix remarked that the restaurant "could change the face of poncey dining".

Zoe Williams for The Daily Telegraph gave the restaurant a rating of nine out of ten, saying that the meat fruit made her want to "stand up and cheer", but again said that although everything served was of the highest quality, the meal did not have a surprise like courses can sometimes have at the Fat Duck. For the same newspaper, Matthew Norman described it as a "theatrical tour de force". He described the restaurant's opening as flawless and described it as the "hottest ticket in town for a very long time to come" with a rating of ten out of ten.

Chef Jason Atherton said that he could not recall a comparable buzz raised by a restaurant, and that he was relieved that the opening of his Pollen Street Social restaurant was not going to take place until late March 2011, a reasonable gap after the opening of Dinner.

Richard Vines, whilst writing for Bloomberg, advised readers to not be put off the hype; he felt that while the courses are not as life changing as those served at the Fat Duck, there are stand out dishes such as the meat fruit and the tipsy cake. He also noted that the meat fruit was a favourite of Pierre Koffmann. Marina O'Loughlin visited the restaurant twice for the Metro newspaper, once just after opening and again several months later to compare how it had settled in. She thought it was a well-oiled operation, but a little too much so, and questioned the originality of it as a version of the meat fruit had previously been available at the restaurant Amber in another Mandarin Oriental Hotel in Hong Kong and little touches as the years of origin which appear next to the menu items have been used before by Marco Pierre White. Jay Rayner for The Observer described the food as "seriously good", and concluded: "Dinner by Heston Blumenthal may be expensive, but it's also bloody lovely. Save up."

In the 2012 Michelin guide, the restaurant was awarded its first Michelin star some nine months after opening, becoming one of only four restaurants in London to gain a star in 2012. It has also been awarded the Restaurant of the Year title by Tatler in 2011, and won the BMW Square Meal Award for Best New Restaurant. The Zagat guide awarded the restaurant the title of Best Newcomer in 2011. In 2012 at number 9 it was the highest new entry in The World's 50 Best Restaurants list by the UK magazine Restaurant, also the highest in the UK. The restaurant received a second Michelin Star in the 2014 Michelin guide, becoming Blumenthal's sixth star.

References

External links

Mandarin Oriental Hyde Park, London 
Dinner by Heston Blumenthal
The free company report: http://intercreditreport.com/company/tapestry-management-limited-06431636 .

2011 establishments in England
2011 in London
British cuisine
European restaurants in London
Historical foods
Michelin Guide starred restaurants in the United Kingdom
Restaurants established in 2011